Mineral Ridge High School is a public high school in Mineral Ridge, Ohio.  It is the only high school in the Weathersfield Local Schools district. It houses Grades 7–12.  Their nickname is the Rams and their colors are orange and black.

Mineral Ridge serves students primarily in Weathersfield Township.

Athletics
Baseball
Softball 
Football 
Volleyball 
Golf 
Soccer
Boys and Girls Track & Field 
Boys and Girls Cross Country 
Boys and Girls Basketball 
Boys and Girls Bowling

Alma mater
The actual music of the Mineral Ridge Alma Mater is the same as Ohio State University's "Carmen Ohio", except adapted to be simpler for high school students

Ohio High School Athletic Association State Championships

 Girls Softball – 1985

References

External links
 District Website

High schools in Trumbull County, Ohio
Public high schools in Ohio